Rönneholmsparken (Rowanholm Park) is a park in Malmö, Sweden.

References

Parks in Malmö